Belle de Jour is a 1967 psychological drama film directed by Luis Buñuel, and starring Catherine Deneuve, Jean Sorel, and Michel Piccoli. Based on the 1928 novel Belle de jour by Joseph Kessel, the film is about a young woman who spends her midweek afternoons as a high-class prostitute, while her husband is at work.

The title of the film is a play on words on the French term belle de nuit ("beauty of the night", i.e., a prostitute), as Séverine works during the day under the pseudonym "Belle de Jour". Her nickname can also be interpreted as a reference to the French name of the morning glory (Convolvulaceae), meaning "beauty of [the] day", a flower that blooms only during the day.

Belle de Jour is one of Buñuel's most successful and famous films with many film historians calling Deneuve's performance her finest. It won the Golden Lion and the Pasinetti Award for Best Film at the Venice Film Festival in 1967.

Plot
Séverine Serizy (Catherine Deneuve), a young and beautiful housewife, is unable to share physical intimacy with her husband, Dr. Pierre Serizy (Jean Sorel), despite their love for each other. Her sexual life is restricted to elaborate fantasies involving domination, sadomasochism, and bondage. Although frustrated by his wife's frigidity toward him, he respects her wishes.

While visiting a ski resort, they meet two friends, Henri Husson (Michel Piccoli) and Renée (Macha Méril). Séverine does not like Husson's manner and the way he looks at her. Back in Paris, Séverine meets up with Renée and learns that a common friend, Henriette, now works at a brothel. At her home, Séverine receives roses from Husson and is unsettled by the gesture. At the tennis courts, she meets Husson and they discuss Henriette and houses of pleasure. Husson mentions a high-class brothel to Séverine at 11 Cité Jean de Saumur. He also confesses his desire for her, but Séverine rejects his advances.

Haunted by childhood memories, including one involving a man who appears to touch her inappropriately, Séverine goes to the high-class brothel, which is run by Madame Anaïs (Geneviève Page), who names her "Belle de Jour." That afternoon Séverine services her first client. Reluctant at first, she responds to the "firm hand" of Madame Anaïs and has sex with the stranger. After staying away for a week, Séverine returns to the brothel and begins working from two to five o'clock each day, returning to her unsuspecting husband in the evenings. One day, Husson comes to visit her at home, but Séverine refuses to see him. Still, she fantasizes about having sex with him in her husband's presence. At the same time, Séverine's physical relationship with her husband is improving and she begins having sex with him.

Séverine becomes involved with a young criminal, Marcel (Pierre Clémenti), who offers her the kind of thrills and excitement of her fantasies. When Marcel becomes increasingly jealous and demanding, Séverine decides to leave the brothel, with Madame Anaïs's agreement. Séverine is also concerned about Husson, who has discovered her secret life at the brothel. After one of Marcel's associates follows Séverine to her home, Marcel visits her and threatens to reveal her secret to her husband. Séverine pleads with him to leave, which he does, referring to her husband as "the obstacle".

Marcel waits downstairs for Pierre to return home and shoots him three times. Marcel then flees but is shot dead by police. Séverine's husband survives but is left in a coma. The police are unable to find a motive for the attempted murder. Sometime later Séverine is at home taking care of Pierre, who is now paralysed, blind and in a wheelchair. Husson visits Pierre to tell him the truth about his wife's secret life; she does not try to stop him. After Husson leaves, Séverine returns to see Pierre crying. In an ambiguous ending which is hinted to be another of her fantasies, Pierre then gets out of the wheelchair, pours himself a drink and discusses holiday plans with Séverine.

Cast
Catherine Deneuve as Séverine Serizy, alias Belle de Jour
Jean Sorel as Pierre Serizy
Michel Piccoli as Henri Husson
Geneviève Page as Madame Anaïs
Pierre Clémenti as Marcel
Françoise Fabian as Charlotte
Macha Méril as Renée
Maria Latour as Mathilde
Marguerite Muni as Pallas
Francis Blanche as Monsieur Adolphe
François Maistre as The professor
Georges Marchal as Duke
Francisco Rabal as Hyppolite

Production
Costume design
Much of Deneuve's wardrobe was designed by Yves St. Laurent.

Filming locations
1 Square Albin-Cachot, Paris 13, Paris, France
79 Champs-Élysées, Paris 8, Paris, France
Chalet de la Grande Cascade, Bois de Boulogne, Paris 16, Paris, France
Champs Elysées, Paris 8, Paris, France
Rue de Messine, Paris 8, Paris, France (Serizy's home)

Release

Critical response
On review aggregator Rotten Tomatoes, Belle de Jour holds an approval rating of 95%, based on 58 reviews, and an average rating of 8.6/10. Roger Ebert of RogerEbert.com gave the film 4 stars out of 4 and included it into his Great Movies list.

Awards and nominations

Home media
American director Martin Scorsese promoted a 1995 limited re-release in America and a 2002 release on DVD.

Legacy
In 2006, the Portuguese director Manoel de Oliveira released Belle Toujours, imagining a future encounter between the characters of Séverine and Henri Husson from the original film.

In 2010, Belle de Jour was ranked No. 56 in Empire magazine's list, The 100 Best Films of World Cinema.

See also
Sadism and masochism in fiction
Surrealism

References

External links
 
 
 Belle de jour: Tough Love – an essay by Melissa Anderson at The Criterion Collection

1967 films
1967 drama films
1960s erotic drama films
1960s French films
1960s French-language films
1960s Italian films
1960s multilingual films
1960s psychological drama films
1960s Spanish-language films
BDSM in films
Films about adultery in France
Films about prostitution in Paris
Films about sexual repression
Films based on French novels
Films directed by Luis Buñuel
Films produced by Robert and Raymond Hakim
Films shot in Paris
Films with screenplays by Jean-Claude Carrière
French erotic drama films
French multilingual films
French psychological drama films
French-language Italian films
Golden Lion winners
Italian erotic drama films
Italian multilingual films
Italian psychological drama films
Spanish-language French films